Lej may refer to:

Places
 Ləj, a village and municipality in the Lankaran Rayon of Azerbaijan
 Lej, Iran, a village in West Azerbaijan Province, Iran
 Lashkar-e-Jhangvi (LeJ), an Islamist militant organization.
 Leipzig/Halle Airport, a public airport serving both Leipzig, Saxony and Halle, Saxony-Anhalt, Germany

Others
 Lengola language, a Bantu language of the Democratic Republic of the Congo
 L.E.J, a French singing trio